Barbe or Barbé is a surname, and may refer to:

 David Barbe (born 1963), American musician and producer/engineer 
 François Barbé-Marbois (1745–1837), French politician
 Ghislain Barbe, Canadian illustrator and artist
 Helmut Barbe (born 1927), German composer
 Henri Barbé (1902–1966), French communist
 Jane Barbe (1928–2003), American voice actress and singer
 Koen Barbé (born 1981), Belgian road bicycle racer
 Laurent Barbé (1696–1764), French citizen and Danish shipbuilder
 Pierre Barbe (1900–2004), French architect

See also
 Barbey (disambiguation)
 Barbee (disambiguation)
 Barbie (disambiguation)
 Barbi (disambiguation)
 Barby (disambiguation)
 Barb (disambiguation)